Camden is a historic town and suburb of Sydney, New South Wales, located 65 kilometres south-west of the Sydney central business district. Camden was the administrative centre for the local government area of Camden Council until July/August 2016 and is a part of the Macarthur region.

History

Indigenous people
The area now known as Camden was originally at the northern edge of land belonging to the Gandangara people of the Southern Highlands, who called it Benkennie, meaning 'dry land'. North of the Nepean River were the Muringong, the southernmost of the Darug people, while to the east were the Tharawal people. They lived in extended family groups of 20–40 members, hunting kangaroos, possums and eels and gathering yams and other seasonal fruit and vegetables from the local area. They were described as 'short, stocky, strong and superbly built' and generally considered peaceful. However, as British settlers encroached on their land and reduced their food sources, they turned to armed resistance which ended in 1816 after many of their number were massacred.

European settlement
Explorers first visited the area in 1795 and named it 'Cowpastures' after a herd of cattle that had disappeared was discovered there. In February 1805, Governor King instructed (apparently reluctantly) a surveyor to measure  for John Macarthur at Cowpastures, where Macarthur had been promised land by the Secretary of State for War and the Colonies, Lord Camden. Macarthur named his property Camden Park in honour of his sponsor.

As Macarthur's wool industry thrived, local citizens began pushing for the establishment of a town in the area to support the industry. Surveyor-General Major Thomas Mitchell suggested Macarthur surrender  of his land for the purpose to which he refused. Following his death in 1834, his children decided to subdivide the land and the first lots in the new town of Camden went on sale in 1840. Camden Post Office opened on 1 May 1841, the day after the nearby Elderslie office (open from 1839) closed. By 1883, the population had grown to over 300 and a movement began to establish a local council which held its first meeting in 1889.

Heritage listings 
Commonwealth Heritage List places:
 Camden Post Office, 135 Argyle Street
NSW State Heritage Register listed places:
 Camden Park House and Garden, Elizabeth Macarthur Avenue
 Camden Park Estate and Belgenny Farm, Elizabeth Macarthur Avenue
 Macquarie Grove, Aerodrome Road
 Nant Gwylan and Garden, Exeter Street
 St Johns Anglican Church Precinct, incorporating St John's Anglican Church, 6-22 Menangle Road

Transport
Between 1882 and 1963, Camden station connected Camden to Campbelltown and Sydney by the Camden railway line. Camden is served by Camden Airport, which is mostly used by trainee pilots for flying schools, the Australian Air League, and other forms of general aviation.

Climate
Camden has a humid subtropical climate (Köppen climate classification: Cfa).

Education
Camden is the location of research facilities for the veterinary and agricultural schools of the University of Sydney. The local government area has three public high schools, Camden High School, Elderslie High School and Elizabeth Macarthur High School, as well as eight Catholic and three Anglican schools.

Culture
The Camden Show is an annual event which combines amusement park attractions with the elements of a state fair. Camden is served by three local radio stations, 2MCR, Vintage FM and C91.3FM. Local newspapers are the Camden Advertiser, the District Reporter and the Macarthur Chronicle.

People

Demographics
According to the 2016 census, there were 3,230 residents in Camden. In Camden, 80.0% of people were born in Australia. The most common other countries of birth were England 4.5%, New Zealand 1.6%, Scotland 0.9%, Ireland 0.8% and Germany 0.6%. 87.8% of people only spoke English at home. Other languages spoken at home included Spanish 0.6%, German 0.5%, Croatian 0.5%, Mandarin 0.4% and Italian 0.4%. The most common responses for religion in Camden were Catholic 30.7%, Anglican 26.4% and No Religion 19.9%.

Politics 
Camden lies within the local government area of Camden Council. The council consists of nine councillors; three for each of the three wards; North Ward (Bringelly, Rossmore, Leppington, Cobbitty, Oran Park, Catherine Field, Harrington Park, Kirkham), Central Ward (Mount Annan, Currans Hill, Smeaton Grange, Narellan Vale) and South Ward (Ellis Lane, Narellan, Grasmere, Camden, Elderslie, Spring Farm, Bickley Vale, Cawdor, Camden South). Lara Symkowiak was elected mayor in 2012.

The southern part of the Camden LGA including Camden town centre is contained within the federal electorate of Hume while the northern end of the LGA (north of Narellan Road) is within the federal electorate of Macarthur. The state seat of Camden covers all of the Camden LGA, and parts of the City of Campbelltown and the City of Liverpool.

The state member for Camden is Peter Sidgreaves, first elected in 2019. The federal member for Macarthur is Mike Freelander, first elected in 2016 and the federal member for Hume is Angus Taylor, first elected in 2013. Both Angus Taylor and Peter Sidgreaves are members of the Liberal Party of Australia while Mike Freelander is a member of the Australian Labor Party.

Planning issues
On 27 May 2008 Camden Council rejected plans from the Quranic Society to build a 1,200-student Islamic school in the nearby suburb of Cawdor on planning grounds. The issue received national and international media coverage. The proposal was opposed from within the local community, many expressing fear and hatred about the presence of Muslims in an area where relatively few Muslims live. There were angry comments by a number of residents in Camden that were viewed as racist and Islamophobic. The Christian Democratic Party (CDP) opposed the proposal. Speaking at a public meeting in December 2007, CDP leader Fred Nile (present alongside Robert Balzola) said he opposed the school "because Islam opposed Christianity". A spokesman for the Quranic Society said it was "absurd" to claim that Muslims are anti-Christian.

In making its decision several council members, including Mayor Chris Patterson, said the school was inappropriate for the semi-rural area of Camden and likely to cause parking, traffic and other problems. Australian Prime Minister Kevin Rudd indicated before the council decision that he wouldn't support the school on planning grounds. The Quranic Society said it will appeal the council's decision in the Land and Environment Court of New South Wales.

In September 2008, a proposal to build a private Catholic school received media attention for not provoking the same sort of outcry as the previous proposal. Some residents who were not supportive of the Islamic school now welcomed the Catholic school proposal.

On 2 June 2009, The Land and Environment Court passed down the decision to reject the appeal by the Quranic Society, with the court stating that the "development application was not suitable for the rural nature of the land."

However, on 17 May 2021, it was announced that A-League team Macarthur FC had acquired  of the planning grounds to construct a football precinct to house the team's future W-League squad, as well as the National Premier Leagues NSW squads.

Notable residents

 Jason Behrendorff, cricketer
 Steven Bradbury, short track speed skater who won Australia's first Winter Olympics gold medal
 Professor Graeme Clark, inventor of the Bionic Ear
 James Francis Dwyer (1874–1952), author  
 Chloe Esposito, modern pentathlon competitor who won the gold medal in the 2016 Rio olympics
 Amy Harrison, association football player (Sydney FC and Washington Spirit)
 Daniel Heckenberg, rugby league player
 Rob Hirst, drummer with the band Midnight Oil
 John Macarthur, father of the Australian wool industry
 Francis Arthur Macarthur-Onslow (1875–1938), grazier and businessman
 James William Macarthur-Onslow (1867–1946), soldier, grazier and politician 
 Dustin Martin, Australian rules footballer
 Hugh McCrae, Australian poet, biographer, illustrator
 Mat Mladin, world motorcycle champion
 Elizabeth Ralston, association football player at Sydney FC.
 Garry Rush, racing driver

References

External links

  [CC-By-SA]
 Camden Council website
Heritage
 Camden Park House & Garden
 Camden Park Estate and Belgenny Farm
 St Johns Anglican Church Precinct

 
Suburbs of Sydney
Populated places established in 1840
1840 establishments in Australia